José Luis Cuerda Martínez (18 February 19474 February 2020) was a Spanish film director, screenwriter and producer. He was born in Albacete and died on 4 February 2020 at the age of 72 in Madrid from an embolism.

He won four Goya Awards: in 1987, 1988, 2000 and 2009.

Filmography as director
 1982 – Pares y nones
 1983 – Total (film for TV)
 1985 – Mala racha (film for TV)
 1987 – El bosque animado
 1989 – Amanece, que no es poco
 1991 – La viuda del capitán Estrada
 1992 – La marrana
 1993 – Tocando fondo
 1995 – Así en el cielo como en la tierra
 1999 – Butterfly's Tongue
 2000 – Primer amor
 2004 – ¡Hay motivo! (episode: "Por el mar corre la liebre")
 2006 – The Education of Fairies
 2008 – The Blind Sunflowers
 2012 – Todo es silencio
 2018 – Tiempo después

References

External links

1947 births
2020 deaths
People from Albacete
Spanish film directors
Film directors from Castilla–La Mancha
Spanish male screenwriters
Spanish film producers
Deaths from embolism
20th-century Spanish screenwriters
20th-century Spanish male writers
21st-century Spanish screenwriters